Aleksandr Viktorovich Uvarov (Russian: Александр Викторович Уваров; born 13 January 1960) is a Russian and Israeli (since 2003) former football player. He is current goalkeeping coach of Maccabi Tel Aviv.

Career
During his club career he played for FC Dynamo Moscow and Maccabi Tel Aviv He earned 11 caps for the USSR national football team, and participated in the 1990 FIFA World Cup, playing matches against Argentina and Cameroon. He tragically lost his wife due to medical complications in May 2021, whilst she was visiting her family in Moscow, Russia. He is the current youth coach at Maccabi Tel Aviv and lives in Israel with his two children.

Honours

Player

Dynamo Moscow
Soviet Cup (1):
1984

Maccabi Tel Aviv
Israeli Premier League (3):
1991/92, 1994/95, 1995/96
State Cup (2):
1993/94, 1995/96
Toto Cup (2):
1992/93, 1998/99

External links
 
 
 

1960 births
People from Orekhovo-Zuyevo
Living people
Russian footballers
Soviet footballers
Soviet expatriate footballers
Soviet Union international footballers
1990 FIFA World Cup players
Association football goalkeepers
Footballers from Moscow
Soviet Top League players
Israeli Premier League players
FC Dynamo Moscow players
Maccabi Tel Aviv F.C. players
Russian expatriate footballers
Expatriate footballers in Israel
Soviet expatriate sportspeople in Israel
Russian expatriate sportspeople in Israel
Russian football managers
Israeli football managers
Russian emigrants to Israel
Naturalized citizens of Israel
Association football goalkeeping coaches